"One More Time" is a song recorded by Swedish singer Benjamin Ingrosso. The song was released as a digital download in Sweden on 18 August 2017, peaked at number 79 on the Swedish Singles Chart and was certified gold in 2018.

Music video
A music video to accompany the release of "One More Time" was first released onto YouTube on 18 August 2017 at a total length of three minutes and eleven seconds.

Track listing

Chart performance

Weekly charts

Certifications

Release history

References

2017 singles
2017 songs
English-language Swedish songs
Benjamin Ingrosso songs
Swedish pop songs